Francis Perrin (17 August 1901 – 4 July 1992) was a French physicist,
the son of Nobel prize-winning physicist Jean Perrin.

Physicist 
Francis Perrin was born in Paris and attended École Normale Supérieure in Paris. In 1928 he obtained a doctorate in mathematical sciences from the faculté des sciences of Paris, based upon a thesis on Brownian motion and became a faculty member of Collège de France. In 1933, in connection with the neutrino, Francis Perrin estimated that "the mass must be null—or at least small compared to the mass of the electron". Subsequently he worked at the Collège de France on the fission of uranium. With Frédéric Joliot and his group, he established in 1939 the possibility of nuclear chain reactions and nuclear energy production.

He was professor at the Collège de France in the chair of Atomic and Molecular Physics from 1946 to 1972. He was the French high-commissioner for atomic energy from 1951 to 1970. In 1972, he discovered the Oklo natural reactor.

Perrin actively supported the project for a European nuclear research centre, and was a signatory for France to the Convention establishing the CERN Provisional Council in February 1952 in Geneva. He was elected Vice-President of this Council, and remained French delegate on the CERN Council until 1972.

Nuclear High-Commissioner 

Named High-Commissioner of the Commissariat à l'énergie atomique (Atomic Energy Commission, CEA) in 1951—to replace Frédéric Joliot-Curie dismissed because he was opposed to military research—, Francis Perrin joined a lobby of about a dozen people, composed of politicians like Chaban-Delmas, Bourguès-Maunoury and Félix Gaillard, of military officers, like the generals Ailleret, Gallois, and Crépin, of technocrats like Pierre Guillaumat and Raoul Dautry or of scientists like Yves Rocard and Bertrand Goldschmidt, who revealed themselves to  be extremely effective. This lobby imposed on successive governments of the Fourth Republic an intensive research program to permit France to deploy nuclear weapons without any real political control from outside France. Secret departments were made up within the CEA to implement this policy as of 1954. General Charles de Gaulle was informed of the work during his "Crossing of the Desert" (1953/58), in particular by Chaban-Delmas. When de Gaulle returned to power in 1958, the progress of the work was such that the date of the first nuclear test was already fixed at 1960.

In 1986 he stated publicly that in 1949 Israeli scientists were invited to the Saclay Nuclear Research Centre, this cooperation leading to a joint effort including sharing of knowledge between French and Israeli scientists especially those with knowledge from the Manhattan Project.

Personal life 
Francis Perrin married Colette Auger, the sister of the physicist Pierre Auger. Francis Perrin was the president of Union des Athées (Union of Atheists) after his resignation from the French atomic energy commission.

Works 

 Etude mathématique du mouvement brownien de rotation (thèse de doctorat) (1928)/A mathematical study of rotation brownian motion
 La Fluorescence des solutions, induction moléculaire, polarisation et durée d'émission, photochimie (1929)/Solutions fluorescence, molecular induction, polarisation and emission duration, photochemistry
 Fluorescence (1931)/Fluorescence
 La dynamique relativiste et l'inertie de l'énergie (1932)/Relativistic dynamics and energy inertia
 Théorie quantique des transferts d'activation entre molécules de même espèce. Cas des solutions fluorescentes (1932)/Quantum theory of activation transfer between molecules of same species, the case of fluorescent solutions
 Calcul relatif aux conditions eventuelles de transmutation en chaine de l’uranium (1939)/Calculation relative to eventual conditions of chain transmutation of uranium 
 Traité du calcul des probabilités et de ses applications, avec Émile Borel (1939)/Work on probability calculation and its applications, with Émile Borel
 Valeurs internationales des sections efficaces des isotopes fissiles pour les neutrons thermiques (1955)/International values of cross sections of fissil isotopes for thermic neutrons
 L'Euratom (1956)/Euratom
 Funérailles nationales de Frédéric Joliot (1958)/National obituary of Frederic Joliot
 Leçon terminale, Chaire de physique atomique et moléculaire (1972)/Terminal lesson, atomic and molecular physics pulpit
 Écrits de Francis Perrin (1998)/Writings of Francis Perrin

References

External links 

Annotated Bibliography for Francis Perrin from the Alsos Digital Library for Nuclear Issues
 Biographie sur le site du Collège de France (archived 27 September 2011) 

1901 births
1992 deaths
French atheists
French physicists
École Normale Supérieure alumni
Members of the French Academy of Sciences
People associated with CERN